Sandy Nafis (born March 6, 1955) is an American politician who served in the Connecticut House of Representatives from the 27th district from 1999 to 2015.

References

1955 births
Living people
Democratic Party members of the Connecticut House of Representatives